Golgo 13 is the second studio album by Cult of Jester, released on December 1, 2000 by Flaming Fish.

Reception
The Phantom Tollbooth called Golgo 13 "a breakthrough for the band and its fans" and that "Finkler has not only brought up the guitar with productive results, but the vocals are front and center; and, as it turns out, that was a good move, too."

Track listing

Personnel
Adapted from the Golgo 13 liner notes.

Cult of Jester
 Ed Finkler – vocals, instruments, production, design

Additional performers
 Patrice Synthea – additional vocals (13)

Production and design
 Wasabi Gelatine – vocal engineering (8)
 Ken Holewczynski – cover art, illustrations, design
 Carson Pierce – executive-producer
 Josh Pyle – vocal engineering (8), remixer (15)

Release history

References

External links 
 
 Golgo 13 at Discogs (list of releases)
  Golgo 13 at Bandcamp
 Golgo 13 at iTunes

2000 albums
Cult of Jester albums